The Heart of America Invitational was a golf tournament on the LPGA Tour from 1955 to 1962. It was played in Kansas City, Missouri area.

Tournament locations

Winners
Heart of America Invitational
1962 Mickey Wright

Kansas City Open
1961 Louise Suggs
1959-60 No tournament
1958 Bonnie Randolph

Heart of America Invitational
1957 Louise Suggs

Kansas City Open
1956 Mary Lena Faulk

Heart of America Open
1955 Marilynn Smith

References

Former LPGA Tour events
Golf in Kansas
Golf in Missouri
Sports in the Kansas City metropolitan area
Recurring sporting events established in 1955
Recurring sporting events disestablished in 1962
1955 establishments in Missouri
1962 disestablishments in Missouri
History of women in Missouri
History of women in Kansas